Obila is a genus of moths in the family Geometridae erected by Francis Walker in 1869.

References

Larentiinae